Tyson Philpot (born July 26, 2000) is a professional Canadian football wide receiver for the Montreal Alouettes of the Canadian Football League (CFL).

University career

Philpot was recruited by multiple U Sports football programs following high school, and ultimately committed to play for the Calgary Dinos in January 2018. In his rookie year, in 2018, he played in all eight regular season games where he had 32 receptions for 741 yards and four touchdowns. He also recorded the longest catch in program history when he had a 107-yard touchdown reception on September 7, 2018, against the UBC Thunderbirds. At the end of the season, he was named a Canada West All-Star and was awarded the Peter Gorman Trophy as the U Sports Rookie of the Year.

In his sophomore season in 2019, Philpot suffered a foot injury and only played in the first and last games of the regular season where he had four receptions for 87 yards and one touchdown. However, he played in all four post-season games where he had 14 catches for 234 yards and one touchdown. In the 55th Vanier Cup game, he had four catches for 52 yards as the Dinos defeated the Montreal Carabins and Philpot won his first national championship.

Due to the cancellation of the 2020 U Sports football season, Philpot did not play in 2020. However, he returned in 2021, where he finished third in the country with 746 receiving yards from 41 catches and led all of U Sports with nine receiving touchdowns in just six games. He was again named a Canada West All-Star and U Sports First Team All-Canadian, and was also named the Canada West player of the year. However, the Dinos failed to qualify for the playoffs and were unable to defend their Vanier Cup title. For his U Sports career, he played in 16 regular season games where he had 77 receptions for 1,574 yards and 14 touchdowns.

Professional career
Philpot was ranked as the sixth best player in the Canadian Football League's Amateur Scouting Bureau final rankings for players eligible in the 2022 CFL Draft, and third by players in U Sports. He was then drafted in the first round, ninth overall, in the 2022 draft by the Montreal Alouettes and signed with the team on May 13, 2022. Following training camp for the 2022 season, Philpot earned a spot on the team's active roster and made his professional debut on June 9, 2022, against his brother's team, the Calgary Stampeders, where he had five punt returns for 38 yards and two kickoff returns for 63 yards. He scored his first career touchdown on July 14, 2022, against the Edmonton Elks, when he caught a six-yard pass from Trevor Harris. Philpot finished his rookie year having played in all 18 regular season games and recorded 39 receptions for 459 yards and two touchdowns, 11 punt returns for 153 yards, and 12 kickoff returns for 342 yards. For his strong season, he was the East Division's nominee for the CFL's Most Outstanding Rookie Award. He also played in two playoff games in 2022 where he had 12 catches for 161 yards and one touchdown, including his first 100-yard receiving game which occurred in the East Final loss to the Toronto Argonauts. Following the season Philpot had a workout with the Pittsburgh Steelers of the National Football League (NFL).

Personal life
Philpot was born in Delta, British Columbia to parents Colleen Purcell and Cory Philpot. His father played in six seasons in the Canadian Football League as a running back and enrolled Philpot in football when he was six years old. Philpot has a twin brother, Jalen Philpot, who is older by seven minutes, who also plays professionally as a receiver for the Calgary Stampeders.

References

External links
Montreal Alouettes bio

2000 births
Living people
Calgary Dinos football players
Canadian football wide receivers
Montreal Alouettes players
Players of Canadian football from British Columbia
People from Delta, British Columbia
Canadian Football League Rookie of the Year Award winners